Penicillium subericola is a fast growing species of fungus in the genus Penicillium which was isolated from raw cork.

References

Further reading
 

subericola
Fungi described in 2010